DatVietVAC (or Dat Viet VAC) is a Vietnamese media, entertainment and technology group. Founded in 1994 by Dinh Ba Thanh, it is described as Vietnam's first and largest media company and launched the first private TV channel in the country. The group operates the major Vietnamese OTT streaming platform VieON.

The headquarter of DatVietVAC is based in Ho Chi Minh City & Hanoi. The group has three divisions: media ownership including TV channels, communications services, and content provision. As a media and communication provider it has served clients such as Masan, Vinamilk, Unilever or PepsiCo...

History 

In 1994, DatVietVAC was founded as the first privately owned media and communications agency in Vietnam, operating the first private TV channel.

In 2008, the communications company WPP acquired a 30% stake in DatVietVAC.

In 2012, DatVietVAC launched a joint venture with the Lotte Corporation to broadcast a shopping channel on cable TV in Vietnam.

In 2013, DatVietVAC was selected as a top-25 global growth company by the World Economic Forum.

In 2020, the OTT streaming platform VieON was rolled out in a collaboration with BCG Digital Ventures. The application has around 100 Vietnamese and international TV channels and more than 100,000 hours of movies, combined with features like personalised content or live-streaming and exclusive contents. It is the first Vietnamese solution to watch local and global contents on one platform with dramas, TV shows and Vietnamese, Hollywood, South Korean, or Chinese movies.

References 

Economy of Ho Chi Minh City
Companies based in Ho Chi Minh City
Vietnamese companies established in 1994
Mass media companies established in 1993